Medina was a non-metropolitan district in Isle of Wight, England. It was abolished on 1 April 1995 and replaced by Isle of Wight Council.

Political control
From the first election to the council in 1973 until its abolition in 1995, political control of the council was held by the following parties:

Council elections
1973 Medina Borough Council election
1976 Medina Borough Council election
1979 Medina Borough Council election (New ward boundaries)
1983 Medina Borough Council election
1987 Medina Borough Council election (Borough boundary changes took place but the number of seats remained the same)
1991 Medina Borough Council election

Borough result maps

By-election results

References

External links

 
Council elections in the Isle of Wight
District council elections in England